Uncle's New Blazer is a 1915 American silent short comedy film directed by and starring William Garwood in the lead role with Violet Mersereau. Nell Craig also starred.

External links

1915 films
1915 comedy films
Silent American comedy films
American silent short films
American black-and-white films
1915 short films
American comedy short films
1910s American films